Agudas Achim is a synagogue located in Bexley, Ohio. It was established in Columbus in 1881, and by 1897 was no longer the only Orthodox synagogue in the city. Presently, Agudas shares Broad Street with three other synagogues - Ahavat Shalom, Temple Israel, and Tifereth Israel.

Agudas Achim Cemetery
A well-known Agudas cemetery is located not too far from the synagogue, off Alum Creek Drive.  Old Agudas Achim cemetery is still preserved.

Agudas Achim today

In September 2010, Rabbi Mitchell Levine was appointed Scholar in Residence in order to allow the synagogue to place greater emphasis on Jewish education for all ages. In June 2011, he joined Rabbi Melissa F. Crespy as a rabbi of the congregation. In January 2011, Agudas Achim became the first synagogue to appoint a full-time Environmental Scholar in Residence, Ariel Kohane, to its staff.

Affiliation
Originally Agudas came to Columbus as an Orthodox congregation.  According to the synagogue's website and the Columbus Jewish Federation, the congregation is Conservative. The change in affiliation came after the congregation refused to comply with a responsum from the Orthodox Union calling for all Orthodox synagogues to put up a mechitzah.

References

External links
 

Bexley, Ohio
Conservative synagogues in Ohio
1881 establishments in Ohio
Religious organizations established in 1881